Divna is a given name. Notable people with the name include:

Divna Ljubojević (born 1970), or just Divna, Serbian singer of Orthodox Christian sacred music
Divna Pešić (born 1979), Macedonian sport shooter
Divna Veković (1886–1944), first female medical doctor in Montenegro
Divna M. Vuksanović (born 1985), Serbian philosopher